The MEC 16 SB is a German 16 mm subminiature camera launched in 1957 by Feinwerktechnik Gmbh of Lahr, Germany.  The lens is a Rodenstock Heligon 1:2/22mm with diaphragm working on principle of "cat's pupil".  The MEC 16 SB was designed by A. Armbruster.  It is the first camera with built-in exposure meter, capable of measuring the light through the lens, the so-called Through-the-lens metering (TTL).

Focal plane shutter  B,1/30,1/60,1/125,1/250,1/500,1/1000

Though it is not a single-lens reflex camera, it has been recognized for being the first camera having a serially integrated exposure meter (Gossen), capable of measuring light through its picture-taking lens, connected.

MEC-16 uses single or double perforated 16mm film in special metal cassette. Frame size  10x14mm.

Subminiature cameras